Kraev is a Slavic masculine surname, its feminine counterpart is Kraeva. Notable people with the surname include:

Andrian Kraev (born 1999), Bulgarian footballer
Bozhidar Kraev (born 1997), Bulgarian footballer

Russian-language surnames
Bulgarian-language surnames